Kojo Vincent Oppong Nkrumah (born 5 April 1982) is a Ghanaian politician and lawyer. He is the member of parliament for the Ofoase-Ayirebi constituency.

Early life 
Nkrumah was born in Koforidua, in the Eastern Region of Ghana. His parents are Kwame Oppong Nkrumah and Felicia Oppong Nkrumah. His mother was a teacher and his father was initially a teacher before becoming a banker. He hails from Akim Anyinase.

Education 

Nkrumah had his basic school education at St. Bernadette Soubirous School in Dansoman, continued to Pope John Senior High School and Minor Seminary in Koforidua for his senior high education and later studied at the University of Cape Coast, where he received a bachelor's degree in Commerce. In 2012 he graduated with an MBA in Marketing from the University of Ghana, Legon. In 2014 he was awarded a bachelor's degree in law (LLB) at the GIMPA Faculty of Law after two years of studies.  In 2016 he was called to the Bar as a barrister and solicitor of the Supreme Court of Ghana.

Career 

Nkrumah started his career as a Treasury Analyst at British American Tobacco in 2006. He moved on to Joy FM as a broadcast journalist, hosting the Super Morning Show after the departure of host Komla Dumor. In 2014 Nkrumah bowed out of broadcasting to establish an investment firm, West Brownstone Capital.  By 2016, he had become a lawyer practising at Kulendi, Attafuah and Amponsah at law.

He was selected as a Young Global Leader for 2020 by the World Economic Forum.

Politics 
In 2015 he contested and won the NPP parliamentary primaries for Ofoase-Ayirebi constituency in the Eastern Region of Ghana.

He won this parliamentary seat during the 2016 Ghanaian general elections. He was the Minister for Information in Ghana and is the Cabinet spokesperson on the Economy.

He additionally served as a member of the Finance and Constitutional committees of the 7th Parliament of Ghana. He is currently the President's Representative at the Ministry of Information.

Kojo Nkrumah was announced as designate for information by President Nana Akufo-Addo after he won the 2020 elections.

He was part of a list of minister-designates, including Mavis Hawa Koomson and Minister-designate for Food Agriculture, Dr Owusu Afriyie Akoto who rejected by the minority side at the appointments committee for various reasons.

He was however approved by a majority consensus on the floor of the House after extensive debate on recommendations made by the Appointments Committee.

Personal life 
Kojo is a Christian and married to Akua and has three children: Kwaku, Afua and Kofi.

References 

University of Ghana alumni
1982 births
Living people
New Patriotic Party politicians
University of Cape Coast alumni
People from Koforidua
Pope John Senior High School and Minor Seminary alumni
Ghanaian MPs 2021–2025